Adolf Hitler, dictator of Germany from 1933 to 1945, was also a painter. He produced hundreds of works and sold his paintings and postcards to try to earn a living during his Vienna years (1908–1913). Despite little success professionally, he continued to paint throughout his life.

A number of his paintings were recovered after the Second World War and have been sold at auction for tens of thousands of dollars. Others were seized by the United States Army and are still held by its government. General opinion on his work is mixed; it has been criticized as being cold and unfeeling, with many arguing that Hitler had greater talent as an architect, demonstrated by how he addressed architecture in his paintings as compared to other details such as trees or people.

Style and influences

Hitler's style was very calculated when representing architecture in his paintings. Instead of progressing in his artistic influence, his works copied the artists of the nineteenth century and other masters. He claimed to be the synthesis of many artistic movements but drew primarily from Greco Roman classicism, the Italian Renaissance, and Neoclassicism. He liked the technical ability of these artists, as well as the comprehensible symbolism. He called Rudolf von Alt his greatest teacher. The two show similar subject matter and use of color.

History

Artistic ambition
In his 1925 autobiography Mein Kampf, Adolf Hitler described how, in his youth, he wanted to become a professional artist, but his dreams were ruined because he failed the entrance exam of the Academy of Fine Arts Vienna. Hitler was rejected twice by the institute, once in 1907 and again in 1908. In his first examination, he had passed the preliminary portion which was to draw two of the assigned iconic or Biblical scenes, in two sessions of three hours each. The second portion was to provide a previously prepared portfolio for the examiners. It was noted that Hitler's works contained too few heads. The institute considered that he had more talent in architecture than in painting. One of the instructors, sympathetic to his situation and believing he had some talent, suggested that he apply to the academy's School of Architecture. However, that would have required returning to secondary school from which he had dropped out and to which he was unwilling to return.

According to a conversation in August 1939 before the outbreak of World War II, published in the British War Blue Book, Hitler told British ambassador Nevile Henderson, "I am an artist and not a politician. Once the Polish question is settled, I want to end my life as an artist."

Vienna period
From 1908 to 1913, Hitler tinted postcards and painted houses for a living. He painted his first self-portrait in 1910 at the age of 21. This painting, along with twelve other paintings by Hitler, was discovered by US Army Sergeant Major Willie J. McKenna in 1945 in Essen, Germany. 

Samuel Morgenstern, an Austrian businessman and a business partner of the young Hitler in his Vienna period, bought many of the young Hitler's paintings. According to Morgenstern, Hitler came to him for the first time at the beginning of the 1910s, either in 1911 or in 1912. When Hitler came to Morgenstern's glazier store for the first time, he offered Morgenstern three of his paintings. Morgenstern kept detailed records of his clientele, through which it was possible to locate the buyers of young Hitler's paintings. It was found that the majority of the buyers were Jewish. An important client of Morgenstern, a lawyer by the name of Josef Feingold, bought a series of paintings by Hitler depicting old Vienna.

World War I
When Hitler served in World War I at the age of 25 in 1914, he carried fine paper and canvas with him to the front and spent hours of leave time drawing and painting. The works he painted during this period were among his last before he became a politician. The themes of his wartime painting included farmers' houses, the dressing-station, etc.

Auction sales
A number of Hitler's paintings were seized by the United States Army (some believed to still be in Germany) at the end of World War II. They were taken to the United States with other captured materials and are still held by the US government, which has declined to allow them to be exhibited. Other paintings were kept by private individuals. In the 2000s, a number of these works began to be sold at auction. In 2009, auction house Mullock's of Shropshire sold 15 of Hitler's paintings for a total of £97,672 (US $143,358), while auctioneers at Ludlow Racecourse of Shropshire sold 13 works for over €100,000. In a 2012 auction in Slovakia, a mixed-media painting fetched €32,000. And on November 18, 2014, a watercolor by Hitler of the old registry office in Munich (Standesamt München) sold for €130,000 at an auction in Nuremberg. The watercolor included a bill of sale and a signed letter by Albert Bormann, which may have contributed to its comparatively high selling price. 

In 2015, an auction was held at the Weidler auction house in Nuremberg where 14 paintings dated 1904 to 1922 by Hitler were sold in total for €391,000. A watercolor of Neuschwanstein Castle by Hitler was sold for €100,000 to a buyer from China. A year previously Weidler auction house had sold a Hitler painting to a buyer from the Middle East for around €152,000.

In July 2017, Mullock's Auctions sold two rare oil pictures. One shows a house at a lake.

A group of scholars estimate that there are only 300 completed works by Hitler over the span of his life; however, Hitler mentioned in his book, Mein Kampf, that while in Vienna, he produced around two or three paintings a day. Even if he were to paint one portrait a day for the years he spent in Vienna, that number would be well over 600. Peter Jahn, perhaps one of the foremost experts on Hitler's art, said he had two interviews with Hitler. Hitler said in the six years he spent in Vienna and Munich, from 1908 to 1914, he produced over a thousand paintings, a few of them in oils, like Hitler's tree at a track from 1911.

Jahn was one of the original people assigned by Schulte Stratthaus, before Hitler annexed Austria in 1938. Stratthaus had been appointed by Hitler in 1936 to locate and buy paintings Hitler had painted from 1907 to 1912, and 1921 to 1922. Jahn spent nearly four years tracking down Hitler's early works, until he was called into military service. Jahn became the Art Consultant to the German Embassy in Vienna in 1937, where he would then search for, purchase and collect individual pieces of Hitler's art, in order to allegedly destroy a majority of the paintings. Jahn sold one of the largest collections of Hitler's art, about 18 pieces, with an average selling price of $50,000.

One of the most extensive private collections of Hitler's art was housed at The International Museum of World War II in Natick, Massachusetts.

Critical analysis
In 1936, after seeing the paintings Hitler submitted to the Vienna art academy, John Gunther, an American journalist and author, wrote, "They are prosaic, utterly devoid of rhythm, color, feeling, or spiritual imagination. They are architect's sketches: painful and precise draftsmanship; nothing more. No wonder the Vienna professors told him to go to an architectural school and give up pure art as hopeless".

One modern art critic was asked in 2002 to review some of Hitler's paintings without being told who painted them. He said they were quite good, but that the different style in which he drew human figures represented a profound lack of interest in people.

In a report entitled The Water Colours of Hitler: Recovered Art Works Homage to Rodolfo Siviero, prepared by Fratelli Alinari, Sergio Salvi rejects the characterization of Hitler as "a grim Sunday painter" and describes him instead as a "small time professional painter" of "innocuous and trivial urban landscapes".

Paintings 

Working primarily in watercolor, Hitler used the medium to express both his love of painting and architecture. Charles Snyder says that Hitler's watercolors often show detailed attention to architecture in contrast to the conventional and negligent treatment of plants and trees that often frame the subject.

The Courtyard of the Old Residency in Munich (1914) is a watercolor by Hitler. He depicts the Alter Hof, a stone quad in front of a large manor. During Hitler's time in Munich, he spent most of his days reading and painting, furthering his dream as an independent artist.

The painting shows his style and mastery of watercolor to create strict delineation of the building, but on the left, we see two soft standing trees to contrast the harsh lines of the house. A small fountain between two trees is painted on the left.

The Courtyard of the Old Residency in Munich and a few other paintings by Hitler are archived in the basement of the Army Center of Military History in Washington, D.C., never shown to the public due to their controversial nature.

Gallery

Notes

References
 Barron, Stephanie, Degenerate art: The Fate of the Avant-Garde in Nazi Germany (Los Angeles, Calif.: Los Angeles County Museum of Art, 1991).
 Hitler, Adolf, and Ralph Manheim, Mein Kampf (Boston: Houghton Mifflin Company, 1943).
 Price, Billy, Hitler: The Unknown Artist (Houston, Texas: Billy F. price Publishing Co., 1983).
 Snyder, Charles, The Real Deal - Adolf Hitler Original Artworks, retrieved 10 June 2014.
 Zalampas, Sherree Owens, Adolf Hitler: A Psychological Interpretation of his Views on Architecture, Art, and Music (Bowling Green, Ohio: Bowling Green University Popular Press, 1990).

Further reading

External links

Hitler's Paintings in German Propaganda Archive
Hitler's Paintings of Munich sites and today Traces of Evil

Works by Adolf Hitler
German paintings
Hitler
Painting controversies
Austrian watercolourists